First of October is an American-Canadian indie rock duo formed in Chicago, Illinois, in 2018. It was formed between musical YouTubers Rob Scallon and Andrew Huang from an idea where they would go into a recording studio and write and record a 10-track album in a 10-hour recording session. The duo's name is derived from the day that they recorded their first album, Ten Hours. The band recorded and released three more albums of the sort in 2019, 2021, and 2022 respectively, with plans to repeat the project annually.

History

2018–2020: Ten Hours and Gourmet Ravioli
The duo first formed in late 2018 for a YouTube video where the two would go into Uptown recording studio and record an album in a single 10-hour session. Their first album, Ten Hours, was recorded on October 1, 2018, and released for free on October 15 the same year. The album was mixed and produced by Rob Ruccia of Uptown Recording and formerly of nu metal band From Zero. There was no tour to support the album, which was self-released online. Huang announced the breakup of the band in a video containing all the album's songs, "The band name is the First of October, because that was the day we recorded the album, and the band doesn't exist any other day of the year!"

Exactly one year after the recording of their first album, the band announced in a rerelease of their song "Don't Go" (featuring Brandon Acker on theorbo) that they had reunited in the studio to record a second album to be released later that month. This time there were more instruments than the previous year they recorded, now featuring a piano, synth, 12-string electric guitar in E tuning, and a short scale electric guitar. For this session they gave themselves an additional 2 hours for lunch and a break. The album, called Gourmet Ravioli (in reference to a song on the album titled "Ravioli") was recorded in a single 12-hour session and was released for free on October 26, 2019. At the end of the behind the scenes video on Scallon's YouTube channel, he hinted at another album for 2020, saying, "Thanks for being such a fan of our one day a year band. See you next year." These plans were cancelled due to the COVID-19 pandemic, which Scallon announced on Twitter.

2021–present: Gotta Record Everything Good and CHAOS
On September 30, 2021, Huang uploaded a Youtube video titled "This Is the End", and Scallon posted a comment confirming he and Huang would be reuniting in the studio to record their third album for 2021. On the first of October itself, Rob Scallon posted on the community page of his YouTube channel "First of October is Happening :)" along with a picture of their studio, now in Canada, with a 12 hour timer. They released their third album Gotta Record Everything Good on October 26th, 2021, again with additional instruments such as ukulele, mandolin, 5 and 6-string basses, and banjo. In addition, this was their first album to feature an eleventh song, which was recorded in the final three minutes. The title of the album comes from a recurring character in their discography called Greg, who is mentioned in “Don’t Go to My House” on Ten Hours, “Thirty-First of October” on Gourmet Ravioli, and “Greg!” on this album. Here, Greg is also an acronym for Gotta Record Everything Good, an idea that came from their engineer Rob Ruccia while Scallon and Huang were writing "I Am Not Afraid". Scallon again hinted at an upcoming album for 2022, saying “Thanks so much for being a fan of our one day a year band. See you next year.”

On October 1, 2022, Huang published a video of him and Scallon writing 100 riffs in a day to prove that First of October was true improvisation. This would be the inspiration for their song "Riff Lord" on the following album. That day, Scallon uploaded a video to Twitter announcing the return of the band, now back in Chicago. Huang uploaded the same video to his Twitter. Huang and Scallon also announced that they would be releasing more merch. The merch includes t-shirts, beanies, pins, and cassette tapes distributed through DFTBA Records. Throughout the day Huang and Scallon put out a series of 12 tweets each on their personal accounts, saying the same thing as the other member, seemingly revealing the upcoming album's song titles as they were recording. On October 22, Huang announced the album's name was CHAOS. It was released on October 26th. The album was more Halloween-focused compared to their previous records, as the last two albums contained only one song centered around the holiday, whereas this album had four. This was also their first record to not mention their character, Greg, on any track. On November 5, Scallon posted a video on his secondary YouTube channel, the video titled "Guitar pedals we used on 'CHAOS' (album in a day 2022)". At the end of the video, Rob confirmed they were planning on doing another album the following year.

Band members 
Current lineup

 Rob Scallon – lead and backing vocals, lead and rhythm guitars, bass guitar, drums, mandolin, banjo, ukulele, keyboards, balalaika, percussion
 Andrew Huang – lead and backing vocals, rhythm and lead guitars, drums, keyboards, bass guitar, ukulele, percussion

Additional personnel

 Rob Ruccia – recording, engineering, mixing

Discography 

 Ten Hours (2018)
 Gourmet Ravioli (2019)
Gotta Record Everything Good (2021)
 CHAOS (2022)

References 

Indie rock musical groups from Illinois
Comedy rock musical groups